Torren is a given name. Notable people with the name include:

Torren Ecker (born 1985), American politician
Torren Foot, Australian house music producer

See also
Torre (name)
Torres (surname)
Torrey (name)